DYMB (97.5 FM), broadcasting as 97.5 Love Radio, is a radio station owned by Manila Broadcasting Company through its licensee Philippine Broadcasting Corporation and operated by RVV Broadcast Ventures. Its studio and transmitter are located at the 5th floor, Kahirup Bldg., Guanco St., Iloilo City.

References

Radio stations in Iloilo City
Love Radio Network stations
Radio stations established in 1979